is a Japanese manga series written and illustrated by the manga artist duo Fujiko Fujio about a clumsy boy, Mitsuo Suwa, who is chosen to apprentice to a powerful superhero to save the world along with other superheroes. The manga series was serialized in Weekly Shōnen Sunday in 1967. The first anime series was first produced in black and white in 1967. The second anime series was made in color in 1983 and films were released in 1983, 1984, 1985, 2003 and 2004. Perman is currently being telecasted on Super Hungama channel in India.

Plot 
The story follows a boy named Mitsuo Suwa who meets an alien named Superman, later renamed Birdman. The alien is part of a group that maintains peace in the galaxy and recruits Mitsuo to become a Perman. Mitsuo is given three items, a helmet which multiplies the wearer's physical strength and serves as a mask, a cape that allows the wearer to fly and run with great speed, and a badge which enables the wearer  to breathe underwater and to communicate with Permans that he later meets. The alien instructs Mitsuo that if a Perman's identity becomes known to others, his brain will be destroyed—which is reduced to being turned into an animal in later chapters. To help keep Mitsuo's secret identity, the alien will give Mitsuo a doppelganger robot called a copy-robot who takes Mitsuo's place when he is Perman.

Characters

Main characters 
  / Perman 1
 Mitsuo/Perman is the protagonist of the series. He's 11 and a half-year-old young boy who's chosen as the first Perman by Birdman. Of the five known Perman, he has had the closest calls to having his secret identity revealed. He dislikes studying, being grounded, ghosts, and cockroaches. He is not very good at studying but he can do well if he tries hard. He has a crush on Michiko, a girl from his class. He's a big fan of the idol Sumire Hoshino, who's actually Perman 3/Pergirl. Mitsuo often acts lazy and dumps his work on his copy robot, but works hard when things get serious. As Perman, he is willing to do anything to please others, which sometimes lands him in trouble. At the end of the series, all his achievements as Perman were acknowledged by Birdman and he travels to the planet Bird star for training to become Birdman's successor. He seems to have not been returned to Earth because there is a depiction waiting for return in the era of "Doraemon" which later Hoshino Sumire as an older actress is in. However, there's a manga chapter "Return of Perman" (included in Vol. 2 of Fujiko. F · Fujio Capricorn/Complete works of Fujiko. F. Fujio: Perman) (藤子・F・不二雄大全集第2巻に収録) he returns to Earth only for 2 hours. Mitsuo is voiced by Katsue Miwa in both 1965 and 1983 TV anime.
  / Perman 2
 Booby is a monkey referred to as "Perman 2". Earlier in the manga he lived in a zoo and had to sneak out at night to work (although his mother caught him once and gave him a spanking); later, the authors simply announced that they would retcon his character, making him a pet chimp who lived with an old couple, so that he could work more easily as a superhero. The reason why he is chosen as one of the permans is that, according to Birdman, there should be no discrimination between Earth humans and animals. He is highly intelligent, but because he cannot speak human language, he often uses objects and gestures to get his point across. He acts like a human even though he's a monkey. Booby helps his colleagues with human affairs, although in chapters where he's the main character he works with animals to who he can speak to. Booby is voiced by Hiroshi Ōtake in both the 1965 and 1983 anime series.
  / Perman 3 /  / Pergirl
 Although Sumire is a girl, she is officially addressed as "Perman 3"; however, her teammates often call her called "Perko". Her secret identity, which she never reveals even to her teammates, is a famous child actress. She feels freer when she is Perko because, as a child actress Sumire, she is always treated as a celebrity everywhere she goes. She has a dual personality; In her superhero guise, she is quite tomboyish, bossy, brave, bold, hot-headed, and headstrong, quarreling with Mitsuo and sometimes with Michiko (for Perman). While as Sumire is very kind and mild. In the original series, she lives in a big mansion along with her parents, while in the Shin-Ee version of the animation, she lives alone in a condominium. Her parents live in New York. A woman who seems to be a manager frequently goes in and out of a condominium room and seems to be taking care of her well. She is not good at household stuff such as cooking and sewing in general. She often calls Mitsuo annoying and stupid but inside her heart, she has a soft spot for him and considers him as her treasure (As shown in "What is Perko's Treasure ?"), indicating she loves him more than anything else in the world and he also reciprocates it somewhere in the depth of his heart. Whenever she is in trouble, she tells about it Mitsuo first indicating that he indeed is very close to her. She later reveals her identity aka Sumire only to him and asks him to marry her when he returns from Bird Planet which he willingly agrees with within the final chapter of the manga series (volume 7). Sumire, as an older actress, also makes significant cameo appearances in two chapters of Doraemon, telling Nobita about a faraway person whose return she is waiting for (aka Perman/ Mitsuo) who has gone to another planet to perform his duties as Birdman (in volume 19 and 24 of Doraemon) (In another episode, Sumire was visited by Nobita and Shizuka, who used the Almighty Pass to enter her house and spent time chatting with her. However, the gadget's effect wore off at 6pm and a confused Sumire chased them out of her house.) Sumire is voiced by Yōko Kuri in the 1965 TV anime and Eiko Masuyama in the 1983 TV anime.
  / Perman 4 /  Perboy
 He is the oldest of all the other Permans (18 years). He lives in Osaka and works various part-time jobs for a living. He is very pragmatic and this sometimes pits him against the other Permen. His pragmatic attitude saves the Permen from many of their tribulations. But his sense of responsibility is strong and his mental power is also tough. He often contributes to solving difficult cases by planning out excellent or unusual strategies and excels in the most intelligence and ability among the five Permen (four in the 1983 anime) He is also known for solving arguments between Perman and Perko about what to happen very easily. He is sometimes greedy to other Pāmen but sometimes can help them in whatever problem they have. His dream is to become the owner of a big company and earn a lot of money. Hōzen is voiced by Yoshihisa Kamo in the first anime television series.
  / Perman 5 / 
 Nicknamed Kō-chan, he is the fifth and youngest member of the team. He is a 2-year-old baby, and saw Mitsuo as Perman 1 on one occasion. He was made a Perman to preserve Mitsuo's secret identity. The first anime and manga series had several appearances by Kōichi, but he is nonexistent in the second version of either series. In addition, all but one chapter in the current manga volumes with an appearance by him have been omitted. Kōichi is voiced by Fuyumi Shiraishi in the 1965 TV anime.
  Birdman
 One of the supermen, the guardians of the universe. His name is Superman in the early series, but he has renamed Birdman in later series to avoid violating the copyright of DC. He is the one who gave the Permen their abilities. He always rides a UFO disk. He has been to various places to find candidates for the next Birdman from Superstar (Bird star in 1983 anime and later manga volumes), to give a permanent set as an apprentice and test skills. At that time, it seems that he was checking his / her mind beforehand whether they are qualified to become a permanent. Although he can be very strict when it comes to the Perman identity, he can also be calm and make sure that they don’t take decisions in hurry such as quitting being Perman. He can sometimes be very clumsy when it comes to operating his UFO and handling situations in general. He has a variety of superpowers. In addition to Mitsuo who was selected as a candidate in the last round, many of the permits were selected from around the world to go to the planet Bird star (Superstar), so it seems that he was not the only one who came to the earth from Bird star. Birdman is voiced by Akira Shimada in the 1965 TV anime.
 Copy-robots
 Androids which are given to Permen from Superman to help keep their secret. Each one transforms into a clone of the person who pushes a button on its nose. The memories of that copy robot can also be transferred to the original person by placing both foreheads against each other. In the first series, the robot had a red nose that remained visible even after the transformation, and they often were deactivated by well-meaning people trying to wipe their noses clean. The duplication procedure also copies whatever clothing or items that are on the activator's person, which landed Mitsuo in trouble on a few occasions for abusing this property. These made a cameo in the Doraemon series as one of his many gadgets from the 22nd century.

Supporting characters 
  /  Mitsuko
 Mitsuo's classmate who has a crush on Perman, she often puts together newspaper articles that have been active. Mitsuo admires her unexpectedly. She is beautiful and outstanding in grades, but with a strong temperament character. She treats Mitsuo as just a good friend. In the anime, she talks about future dreams as an "astronaut." She views Pergirl as a rival, and at times clashes with her (with Mitsuo in the middle). She also knows how to play piano and violin very well. Michiko is voiced by Kyōko Emi in the first anime television series.
 
 Mitsuo's short-statured classmate often seen with Kabao. He also has a very weak personality. In the second work it is seen that his father owns a restaurant named "Taberna" (タベルナ). Sabu is voiced by Michiko Nomura in the first anime television series, Shigeru Chiba in the second anime television series. 
 
 Another of Mitsuo's classmates. He is the neighborhood bully. He often picks on Mitsuo, but is a big fan of Perman, often begging him to make him the next member. Together with Sabu, he was tricked by a foreign scientist into stealing Mitsuo's Perman equipment. His father owns a fruit and vegetable shop. At the school, he is a generic captain. At times he does have a friendly and gentle personality. His parents have exactly the same face as him, and his father works not only for fruit and vegetable but also for La ittle League supervisor and trainer. Also, in the second animation film, his father often loses dentures. Kabao is voiced by Kaneta Kimotsuki in the first anime television series.
 
 Another of Mitsuo's classmates who boastfully proud about his wealth. His room is filled with manga comics and remote-controlled toys. In one episode of the 1983 anime, he borrows the Perman set from Mitsuo, only to have them stolen by a dangerous criminal.
 
 He is Mitsuo's dad. Mantarō is often seen as easygoing but will discipline his son responsibly.  He is a typical office worker, the position in the company is the section chief. Mantarō is voiced by Hisashi Katsuta in the first anime television series.
 
 She is Mitsuo's mother and is unnamed in the series. She is a usual housewife and a beautiful mother. She tends not to feel comfortable with the fact that Perman and his teammates often come to their house, and when the criminal who kidnaps Ganko requested a perman set instead of ransom, she gets very angry. Many people around the Perman's often see the perman as a hero of respect, but she often touches with a very strong attitude towards the permen who come to the Suwa residence. She often scolds Mitsuo because of Ganko's complains. Mrs. Suwa is voiced by Kondō Takako in the first anime television series.
 
 Ganko is Mitsuo's younger sister who is headstrong and obstinate, although she is more known for tattling on Mitsuo to their mother.she appears to have a little sibling rivalry with mitsuo. She is an elementary school first-grader in the setting of the second TV work. But she is a kindergarten child in the movie version. She often tells Mitsuo that his sloppy behavior is very annoying although she sometimes gets into arguments with him due to mitsuo often gets fed up with her complains to their mother but despite this they still deeply cares and loves with each other.  In the second TV work, she has a boyfriend named Itimomagejima (イツモマジメ). She also appeared in Doraemon; in the episode "The Cursing Camera". Ganko is voiced by Masako Sugaya in the first anime television series.
 
  He is Mitsuo's homeroom teacher. A young athlete who is fat and seems to be taking all the subjects. He often scolds Mitsuo for not completing his homework and sleeping in class and ends up giving him a punishment of standing out of the class. The nickname is "Higendaruma." Oyama is voiced by Masashi Amamori in the first anime television series.
 
 He is another classmate of Mitsuo. As the name implies Sherlock Holmes, he is a kid who loves finding out things and acts like a young detective. He is very smart. He has a doubt that the identity of Perman 1 is Mitsuo. He tries to grab the evidence many times, but ends up failing each time. In the second work, it is revealed that his father is a detective.
 
 She's introduced in the 1983 TV anime. She's a transfer student who came to the class next to Mitsuo. She met his copy-robot and became his friend. She has a good relationship the copy robot since then. Because of this there are often misunderstandings whenever she talks to the actual Mitsuo.

Antagonists 
  / The man of the thousand masks
 A gentleman thief who is an expert in disguise and jailbreak, and one of Perman's most cunning opponents. He is skilled in escaping because of his love of the thrill of breaking out of prison, and a chapter in the early manga demonstrates that he can't stand the ease of escaping from minimum security. In his first appearance, he was ruthless enough to try to kill Mitsuo, however, he later helped Perman capture the man behind a rash of purse snatchings because the thief had robbed the owner of his favorite ramen restaurant. He is a lover of fine art, which Pāyan uses to his advantage in a museum heist.
  (a.k.a.  )
 The Japanese 'bad-man league', the guild which organizes thieves and burglars in Japan. Despite their schemes to destroy Perman, they are always defeated.
 
 The leader of the ZenGyadoRen.
 
 An evil genius who is the science adviser of ZenGyadoRen and offers them many unusual technologies. As with Haruzō and Ganko, his name can be read in a different way; in his case, it sounds similar to "mad scientist".

Media

Manga
The manga was written by Fujiko F. Fujio and published in 1967. It was published by the Japanese company, Shogakukan, and serialized in Weekly Shōnen Sunday. It has 8 tankōbon and 214 pages.

Anime
Two anime television series based on the manga were produced. The first television series, consisting of 54 two-part episodes, was produced by Tokyo Movie with music composed by Hiroshi Tsutsui. It was broadcast on TBS from April 2, 1967, to April 14, 1968. Certain episodes are lost and some episodes have lost their audio. This version was dubbed into Mexican Spanish, and it is unknown if the dub has any of the lost episodes.

The second anime television series was produced by Shin-Ei Animation under the direction Hiroshi Sasagawa and Sadayoshi Tominaga with Akihiko Takashima composing the music. The series was first broadcast every Monday through Saturday on TV Asahi from April 4, 1983, to March 30, 1985. Starting on April 2, 1985, the series switched to a weekly broadcast and concluded on July 2, 1987, for a total of 526 episodes.

Episode list

1983

1985

Specials

Crossover

Doraemon (2005): Night of the Giant Raccoon Dog

On Fujiko F Fujio's 80th birthday, an hour-long special aired on TV Asahi on September 13, 2013. In this special, Nobita turns to Perman's help when Doraemon turns into a giant raccoon and destroys the whole town.

Doraemon and Perman's Close Call
From 2011 to October 2, 2012, it was screened at the F Theater in the Fujiko F Fujio Museum facility. Doraemon and Nobita enter the TV program "Perman" with Doraemon's secret tool. The first terrestrial broadcast was broadcast on December 31, 2016, under the title of "Doraemon & Perman Close Call !?" in "Omisoka! Doraemon 1 Hour Special !!". The cast on the "Perman" side followed the second work.

References

External links 

 
 

1967 anime television series debuts
1967 manga
1983 anime films
1983 anime television series debuts
1983 manga
1984 anime films
1985 anime films
2003 anime films
Japanese animated films
2004 anime films
Japanese children's animated action television series
Japanese children's animated adventure television series
Japanese children's animated science fiction television series
Japanese children's animated superhero television series
Children's manga
CoroCoro Comic
Fujiko F Fujio
Shin-Ei Animation
Shogakukan manga
Shogakukan franchises
Nintendo Entertainment System games
Nintendo Entertainment System-only games
Japan-exclusive video games
Shōnen manga
TMS Entertainment
TBS Television (Japan) original programming
TV Asahi original programming
Child superheroes
Superhero teams